The office of Prime Minister of the Bechuanaland Protectorate existed from 3 March 1965 to 30 September 1966, during which time it was held by one individual, Seretse Khama, who later served as the first President of Botswana from 1966 until his death on 13 July 1980.

To date, all Prime Ministers and Presidents have represented the Botswana Democratic Party (BDP).

Key
Political parties

Symbols
 Died in office

Prime Minister of the Botswanaland Protectorate

Presidents of Botswana (1966–present)

Lifespan timeline of President of Botswana
This is a graphical lifespan timeline of President of Botswana.  The President are listed in order of office.

<div style="overflow:auto">

Sources
 Botswana at Rulers.org

See also
Botswana
Heads of state of Botswana
Vice-President of Botswana
List of commissioners of Bechuanaland
Lists of office-holders

Heads of government
Botswana
Botswana
Heads of government
Heads of government